is a town located in Nakaniikawa District, Toyama Prefecture, Japan.
, the town had an estimated population of 26,212 in 9452 households  and a population density of 85 persons per km².

Geography
Tateyama is located in east central Toyama Prefecture. The town is located in the Tateyama Mountain Range.

Surrounding municipalities
Toyama Prefecture
Toyama
Kurobe
Kamiichi
Funahashi
Nagano Prefecture
Ōmachi

Climate
The town has a Humid subtropical climate (Köppen Cfa) characterized by hot summers and cold winters with heavy snowfall. The average annual temperature in Tateyama is 13.4 °C. The average annual rainfall is 2242 mm with September as the wettest month. The temperatures are highest on average in August, at around 26.2 °C, and lowest in January, at around 2.1 °C.

Demographics
Per Japanese census data, the population of Tateyama was remarkably stable for several decades but has declined in recent years.

History
The area of present-day Tateyama was part of ancient Etchū Province. The village of Tatayama was created on May 12, 1894. It was elevated to town status on January 10, 1954.

Until about the end of the Edo period, the Gohyakkoku region was called Takaharano. It originates from a time when village government officials asked the Kaga clan for permission to reclaim an open area of wild fields that was worth five hundred kokudaka, or gohyaku-kokudaka. Development went underway, and permission was granted for the formation of a town in the area. Around the area of Gohyakkoku Tenman Shrine, traffic from north to south formed between Toyama Bay and Mt. Tateyama. from there, they would intersect with streets that ran east to west from the town to central Toyama City. This set the scene for growing areas of agriculture and businesses.

Education
Tateyama has seven public elementary schools and one public middle school operated by the village government. There is one public high school operated by the Toyama Board of Education.

The elementary schools are: Tateyama Elementary School, Kamagafuchi Elementary School, Takano Elementary School, Tateyama Chuo Elementary School, Rita Elementary School, Hokubu Elementary School, and Nichuano Elementary School. The middle school and high school are both named Oyama, for the shrines on Tateyama mountain.

Until 2016, there was an eighth elementary school called Shinseto Elementary, but it has since been closed due to a low number of attendees as a result of migration away from the mountainous area and towards the center of the main town.

Tateyama Town's Oyama Junior High School has been reported by Education Departments to have some of the highest English abilities in Toyama Prefecture.

Mascot
Tateyama's town mascot is Raijii, combining the "rai" from "raicho" (Toyama Prefecture's bird found on Mt. Tateyama, the ptarmigan) with "jii" (lit. "old man"). He is said to be 20,005 years old, and his birthday is April 16. He carries a walking stick and his hat is in the shape of the three mountains that make up Tateyama. His job is to patrol Tateyama and protect the beautiful nature found there.

Transportation

Railway
  Toyama Chihō Railway Main Line
  -  
  Toyama Chihō Railway Tateyama Line
 -  -  -  -  -  -  -  -  -  - 
  Toyama Chihō Railway Kamidaki Line

Tateyama Cable Car

Highway
 Hokuriku Expressway

Local attractions
Kurobe Dam
Kurobe River
Shōmyō Falls

References

External links

  
 Tateyama Kurobe Alpine Route
 TRIP TO TATEYAMA
A Promenade Through Town

 
Towns in Toyama Prefecture